Alaid Island (Igingiinax̂ in Aleut) is the westernmost of the Semichi Islands, a subgroup of the Near Islands group that lies at the extreme western end of the Aleutian Islands, Alaska.

References

Semichi Islands
Islands of Alaska
Islands of Unorganized Borough, Alaska